Peplum originates in the Greek word for 'tunic' and may refer to one of the following:
Sword-and-sandal films, a derogatory reference to the genre of Greco-Roman Era costume/adventure films mostly produced in Italy, also known as "peplum".
Péplum (novel), a 1996 work by Belgian novelist Amélie Nothomb.
Peplos, a kind of women's garment in ancient Greece.
An overskirt also referred to as a peplum